Aphonopelma vorhiesi (also called the Tucson bronze or Madrean red rump) is a species of spider in the family Theraphosidae, found in Arizona and New Mexico.  This species looks similar to the Aphonopelma chalcodes, but it is far more rare in captivity.

References

vorhiesi
Spiders described in 1939
Spiders of the United States